Fercani Şener was a Turkish footballer, who played for the Beşiktaş and Harbiye football clubs in the 1920s. He was one of the first black players in Turkish football. In 1924, the Turkish national football team was preparing for the 1924 Summer Olympics and many footballers were called up for the squad, including Fercani Şener. However, Fercani Şener claimed that he was then removed from the squad because he was black; without him, Turkey was eliminated after its first match.

References

Turkish footballers
Beşiktaş J.K. footballers
Association footballers not categorized by position
Year of birth missing
Year of death missing